Camp is a young adult fiction novel written by L. C. Rosen and published in 2020 by Little, Brown. The book tells the story of Randall Kapplehoff, a gay teen who goes every year to a queer summer camp and is finally ready to start a relationship with his crush.

Plot 
Camp follows Randall Kapplehoff, a gay teen who goes to Camp Outland, a queer summer camp, every year. Randall is interested in musical theatre but rebrands himself as Del and makes himself more masculine to impress his crush, Hudson, a "masculine 'straight-acting' muscled deity."

Throughout the book, readers receive lessons about the LGBT community and its history, including definitions of genders and sexualities readers may be unfamiliar with, what happened before Stonewall, the Mattachine Society, and more. Further, the book tackles both societal and internalized homophobia.

Background 
Although Rosen did not attend a summer camp for queer kids, the physical layout of Camp Outland is based on a Jewish summer camp Rosen attended and worked at for several years. Rosen's camp didn't have a drama cabin, but Rosen spent years in theater.

Rosen modeled the story off the 1960s romantic comedies featuring Rock Hudson and Doris Day; he "wanted a vintage-feeling screwball sex comedy but for contemporary queer teens."

The book's title has multiple meanings: "summer camp, camp in the sense of drag queens and also camp in the sense that playing butch is a form of camp, too."

Reception 
Publishers Weekly called the book a "fun, inclusive story that's sex-, romance-, and LGBTQ-positive", while Kirkus Reviews said "[t]his novel has the appeal of a rom-com movie-makeover but with more substantive explorations".

Shelf Awareness highlighted how the book "unashamedly celebrates queerness" as "Rosen explores these identities without ever making them feel like stereotypes or ignoring prejudices in the community." 

Maggie Reagan, who reviewed for The Booklist, noted Rosen's attempt to tackle issues present in the LGBT community, such as internal biases and prejudices, similarly to how he did in his 2018 book, Jack of Hearts (and Other Parts). Reagan ended the review by calling the book "[a]n essential pick for teens figuring out who and how to love." Camp was featured by The Booklist in its list of the ten best romances for young adults published between September, 2019 and August, 2020.

Camp was named one of the best books of the year by ALMA Magazine, Booklist, Elle, The Guardian, the Today Show, and School Library Journal.

Film adaptation 
In October 2021, it was announced that Camp would be adapted into a film for HBO Max And Warner Bros. The film will be directed by Billy Porter and produced by Dan Jinks with the screenplay written by Kit Williamson and Robert O’Hara. Porter will also play Mark, the camp's theater director.

References 

2020 American novels
2020s LGBT novels
Little, Brown and Company books